Chirag Sureshbhai Jani (born 9 November 1989) is an Indian cricketer who plays for Saurashtra in domestic cricket. He is a right-hand batsman and right-arm medium pace bowler. Chirag was born in Mahuva town of Bhavnagar district in Gujarat state of India.

References

External links 

1989 births
Living people
Indian cricketers
Brothers Union cricketers
Saurashtra cricketers
Kolkata Knight Riders cricketers
West Zone cricketers
Gujarati sportspeople